Hildegarde H. Swift (January 10, 1890 – January 10, 1977) was a writer of children's books. One of her books, Little Blacknose: The Story of a Pioneer was the recipient of the Newbery Honor Medal. She is best known for her book The Railroad to Freedom. She won the Newbery Honor in 1933.

Biography
Hildegarde Swift was born in Clinton, New York on January 10, 1890. Her father, Author S. Hoyt was an English Literature professor at Hamilton College. In her younger years, she had private tutors and attended European boarding schools. She later graduated from Auburn High School, moving on to further her education and graduate from Smith College. She continued her studies at the New York School of Social Work where she worked with children, which she credits gave her, her "first real knowledge of children."

She married Arthur L. Swift, a pastor from New York. Their son Hewson H. Swift was born November 8, 1920. In her later years, she taught children's literature at the New School for Social Research. In 1929, she began to write children's books. Swift died on January 10, 1977.

Legacy
Swift's book The Little Red Lighthouse and the Great Gray Bridge has sold more than 400,000 copies. After the United States Coast Guard's plans to tear down the Little Red Lighthouse, Swift's book was used by fans to help make the site a national landmark. Eleanor Roosevelt praised Swift for admonishing young people to care for the wilderness in her writings.

Works
The Railroad to Freedom
The Little Red Lighthouse and the Great Gray Bridge
North star shining, a pictorial history of the American Negro
Little Blacknose: The Story of a Pioneer
 From the Eagle's Wing: A Biography of John Muir

References

External links
 

20th-century American women writers
1890 births
1977 deaths
Smith College alumni
Columbia University School of Social Work alumni
American children's writers
Newbery Honor winners
Writers from New York (state)